The Bahamas men's national tennis team represents the Bahamas in Davis Cup tennis competition and are governed by the Bahamas Lawn Tennis Association.

The Bahamas currently compete in the Americas Zone of Group III.  They reached the World Group Play-offs in 1993.

History
The Bahamas competed in its first Davis Cup in 1989.  Bahamian players previously competed on the Caribbean/West Indies team.

Current team (2022) 

 Kevin Major
 Spencer Newman
 Baker Newman
 Marvin Rolle (Captain-player)

See also
Davis Cup
Bahamas Fed Cup team

External links

Davis Cup teams
Davis Cup
Davis Cup